The Vision of Saint Jerome  is a painting by the Italian Mannerist artist Parmigianino, executed in 1526–1527. It is now in the National Gallery, London, United Kingdom.

History
The work was commissioned on 3 January 1526 in Rome, by Maria Bufalini, wife of Antonio Caccialupi, to decorate the family chapel in the church of San Salvatore in Lauro. The contract mentioned "Francesco Mazola de Parma" and one "Pietro" with the same name, perhaps Parmigianino's uncle Piero Ilario Mazzola. The elongated shape derives from its original destination as part of a triptych, whose sides (never painted) should represent the Immaculate Conception (to which the chapel was dedicated) and the saints Joachim and Anna. 

According to late Renaissance art biographer Giorgio Vasari, Parmigianino was working to this painting during the Sack of Rome, and he had to stop when the city was ravaged by the imperial troops. He was able to escape paying a ransom, while his uncle remained in Rome, being able to hide the painting  in the refectory of Santa Maria della Pace.

In 1558 the Bufalini family decided to move it in their chapel in Sant'Agostino at Città di Castello, from where it was acquired in 1790 by the English painter James Durno. In England, it was sold to the Marquess of Albercon for 1,500 guineas, then, after a series of changes of hand, to the National Gallery, in 1826.

There are preparatory drawings in the Musée Condé, the British Museum and other museums, for a total of some twenty. A drawing in the Galleria nazionale di Parma is the one which is more similar to the final version, although showing a horizontal composition.

Description
The painting is divided into two narrative sectors: a lower one, with Saint Jerome is sleeping near the crucifix (with his traditional symbol, the cardinal hat visible near a skull) and receives the vision of St. John the Baptist, identified by the long cross and the baptismal washbasin which is tied at his belt; St. John indicates the Child, represented in the upper sector between the legs of the Madonna, with a shining background behind them.

Parmigianino's attention to detail is shown by the Baptist's reed cross, the speckled skin which covers him, the undergrowth near the sleeping Jerome, the sheen on Mary's dress, the last perhaps inspired by classical sculptures seen by Parmigianino during his trips.

St. John's raised right arm and upwards-pointing finger are reminiscent of Leonardo's painting St. John the Baptist.

Sources

External links
Page at museum's official website

Paintings of the Madonna and Child by Parmigianino
1520s paintings
Collections of the National Gallery, London
Paintings of Jerome
Paintings depicting John the Baptist
Altarpieces
Skulls in art